Saleem Ahmed (born 1 January 1967) is an Indian politician and member of Karnataka Legislative Council. He represents the Indian National Congress.

Early life and background 
Saleem Ahmed was born on 1 January 1967. Azeez Ahmed was his father. He completed his education B.A.

Personal life 
Saleem Ahmed married Asma Ahmed. The couple has one son and one daughter.

Political career

Early career 
Saleem Ahmed started his political career as a party worker and organized Rallies, Training camps and youth conventions. In 1982 he got elected as Student Union Leader of Sheshadripuram College, Bangalore. In 1984 he became Bangalore City NSUI Vice President later in 1987 he became the President of Karnataka NSUI and General Secretary of All India Youth Congress.

Rise in Karnataka's politics 
He was elected as Member of Karnataka Legislative Council for the first time in 1997 and served as member various committee formed by the KLC. Later in 2000 he was appointed as Government Chief whip in Karnataka Legislative  Council. Again in 2002 he got elected as Member of Karnataka Legislative Council for second time.

In 2002 he became the Member of All India Congress Committee.

He served as Director General of Nehru Yuva Kendra Sangathan, Ministry of Youth Affairs and Sports, Government of India 2012–2014.

He was leader of the Indian delegation to South Korea for the Youth Exchange Program in 2012.

Positions held

Foreign delegations 

 Saleem Ahmed was the leader of the Indian delegation to South Korea for the Youth Exchange Program in the year 2012.

References 

1967 births
Living people
Members of the Karnataka Legislative Council
Indian National Congress politicians from Karnataka
Ministry of Youth Affairs and Sports
Indian Youth Congress